Venancio Shinki (April 1, 1932 – November 17, 2016) was considered one of the most outstanding Peruvian painters. He was born in Supe, Lima, Peru.  His father (Kitsuke Shinki of Hiroshima Prefecture) was Japanese and had arrived to Peru in 1915.  His mother was Peruvian (Filomena Huamán of Huari, Peru).  He was born and raised on the Hacienda San Nicolás in Supe, north of Lima. At that time, Supe attracted a large concentration of Japanese immigrants. He has 3 children from his first marriage to Keiko Higa.

Education and career 
When he was 15 he traveled to Lima to work as a photographer apprentice. At 21 he opened his own photographic studio. He worked as a professor in the Architecture Faculty of the UNI (Universidad Nacional de Ingenieria), as a graphic artist in the Expreso newspaper and as a public servant in the Ministry of Industry and Tourism.

He studied at the National School of Fine Arts of Peru, where he was taught by, among others, Sabino Springuett, Ricardo Grau and Juan Manuel Ugarte Elespuru.  He graduated as the valedictorian in 1962. He received the award Sérvulo Gutiérrez.  He was known to be an abstract expressionism painter. His work was inspired partly by travels through Ecuador, Mexico and Peru, but in its symbolism it also reflected his admiration for the works of Bosch, El Greco, Klee and Mir; with its subtle range of tones and textures and its undefined forms it also expressed elements of his Japanese heritage. His paintings have a mixture of Eastern, Western, and Andean themes, with a distinctive surrealism that shows an intriguing and unknown universe, set off by a purified technique and a renovated figuration.

He started participating in collective expositions since 1963 in Peru and other Countries. In 1966 he won the Teknoquimica award. In 1967 he received the National Award in Painting "Ignacio Merino"   He has received many accolades and has participated in a variety of individual and group exhibits in Peru, Japan, Italy, United States, Colombia, Ecuador, Brazil, Venezuela, Panama, and Mexico, among others. He has also participated in the VII and XII Bi-annual in São Paulo, Brazil; the II Bi-annual of American Art in Argentina; the I and II Bi-Annual in Havana, Cuba; the Bi-annual in Quito, Ecuador. In 1999, the year of the centenary marking Japanese migration to Peru, he was invited to exhibit his work in the Museum of Man in Nagoya, Japan. The Book “Venancio Shinki: retrospectiva 1960–2000", edited by the ICPNA (Peruvian North American Cultural institute) in 2001 shows an important part of his works until that year  His works were displayed in November 2006 during the 34th Annual Japanese Cultural Week in Lima, Peru.

According to one of the most respected Peruvian magazines, Caretas, in the April 3, 1996 edition, a painting of 1.20m x 0.80m from either Szyszlo, Gerardo Chávez, Carlos Revilla or Venancio Shinki could be worth $40,000 then.  An Untitled 33 × 42.75 inches oil on canvas painting sold at Christie's Interiors in 2011 in London.  "Warm shade and cold", a 39.4 × 47.2 inches oil on canvas painting sold by Fine Art Auction Miami in 2013.  His "Lanzon" painting (1993) is now owned by the Inter-American Development Bank.

Death 
In mid 2013, the sale of the work of artist Venancio Shinki will be the main income for a project to form a symphony orchestra for children in Iquitos, Peru. Shinki died on November 17, 2016, aged 84.

References

1932 births
2016 deaths
Peruvian painters
Peruvian male painters
Peruvian people of Japanese descent